The Queen's Flower Girl (Spanish:La florista de la reina) is a 1940 Spanish historical drama film directed by Eusebio Fernández Ardavín and starring Ana Mariscal, María Guerrero and Alfredo Mayo. The film is set in Madrid in the late nineteenth century. Ardavín adapted one of his own plays for the film, which was commercially successful.

Cast
 María Guerrero López (niece of María Guerrero)
 Ana Mariscal 
 Alfredo Mayo
 Jesús Tordesillas
 Juan Barajas 
 Carmen López Lagar 
 Manolita Morán
 Pedro Oltra

References

Bibliography
 Bentley, Bernard. A Companion to Spanish Cinema. Boydell & Brewer 2008.

External links 

1940 films
Spanish historical drama films
1940s historical drama films
1940s Spanish-language films
Films directed by Eusebio Fernández Ardavín
Films set in Madrid
Films set in the 1890s
Films scored by Juan Quintero Muñoz
Spanish black-and-white films
1940 drama films
1940s Spanish films